Zimní stadion Karlovy Vary was an indoor sporting arena located in Karlovy Vary, Czech Republic.  The capacity of the arena was 4,680 people and was built in 1947. It was to home HC Energie Karlovy Vary and HC Energie Karlovy Vary (juniors) ice hockey team until the KV Arena was constructed in 2009.

Indoor ice hockey venues in the Czech Republic
Sport in Karlovy Vary
Buildings and structures in Karlovy Vary
1947 establishments in Czechoslovakia
Sports venues completed in 1947
2009 disestablishments in the Czech Republic
20th-century architecture in the Czech Republic